Andreas Baranski (born 10 March 1960 in Ludwigshafen) is a West German former middle-distance runner who specialised in the 1500 metres. He won a silver medal at the 1983 Summer Universiade. In addition, he competed at three European Indoor Championships reaching the final twice.

International competitions

Personal bests
Outdoor
800 metres – 1:47.33 (Durham 1982)
1000 metres – 2:17.72 (Cologne 1982)
1500 metres – 3:36.43 (Warsaw 1980)
One mile – 3:58.40 (Berlin 1980)
3000 metres – 8:03.9 (Aalen 1981)

Indoor
1500 metres – 3:40.60 (Stuttgart 1985)

References

All-Athletics proile

1960 births
Living people
West German male middle-distance runners
Universiade medalists in athletics (track and field)
Sportspeople from Ludwigshafen
Universiade silver medalists for West Germany
Medalists at the 1983 Summer Universiade